Jackson Center High School is a public high school in Jackson Center, Ohio.  It is the only high school in the Jackson Center Local Schools district.  The  Tigers wear orange and black and compete in the Shelby County Athletic League.

Ohio High School Athletic Association State Championships

 Boys Basketball – 1985
 Girls Basketball – 1995, 2001
 Girls Volleyball - 2015, 2016

References

External links
 District Website

High schools in Shelby County, Ohio
Public high schools in Ohio